Short-track speed skating at the 2011 Asian Winter Games was held at Saryarka Velodrome in Astana, Kazakhstan. The eight events were scheduled for January 31– February 2, 2011.

Schedule

Medalists

Men

Women

Medal table

Participating nations
A total of 56 athletes from 9 nations competed in short track speed skating at the 2011 Asian Winter Games:

References

External links
 Official website

 
2011 Asian Winter Games events
Asian Winter Games
2011